Military occupation of Serbia may refer to:
 Axis occupation of Serbia during WW2 (Serbian territory of the Kingdom of Yugoslavia under German, Croatian, Hungarian, Bulgarian and Italian occupation)
 Territory of the Military Commander in Serbia during WW2 (Serbian territory of the Kingdom of Yugoslavia under Nazi military occupation)
 Bulgarian occupation of Serbia (World War II)
 Axis occupation of Vojvodina during WW2 (Serbian province of the Kingdom of Yugoslavia under Hungarian and Croatian occupation)
 Bulgarian occupation of Serbia (World War I)
 Austro-Hungarian occupation of Serbia (Austro-Hungarian military administration of Serbia during WW1)
 Habsburg-occupied Serbia (1788–92) (Austro-Hungarian military administration of Serbia in the 18th century)
 Habsburg-occupied Serbia (1686–91) (Austro-Hungarian military administration of Serbia in the 17th century)

See also
 Habsburg Serbia (disambiguation)
 Ottoman Serbia
 Hungarian occupation of Yugoslav territories during WW2
 Kosovo

Occupations
Occupation of Serbia